Witches' Flight (also known as Witches in Flight or Witches in the Air) is an oil on canvas painting completed in 1798 by the Spanish painter Francisco Goya. It was part of a series of six paintings related to witchcraft acquired by the Duke and Duchess of Osuna in 1798. 
It has been described as "the most beautiful and powerful of Goya's Osuna witch paintings."

The painting was sold to the Duke and Duchess of Osuna on 27 June 1798, to decorate their villa La Alameda, on the outskirts of Madrid. It was then sold in 1896 at the public auction of the Osuna estate to Ramón Ibarra, and again in 1985 to Jaime Ortiz Patiño. Finally, it was acquired by the Prado in 1999, where it remains to this day.

At center point are three semi-nude witches wearing penitential coroza 
bearing aloft a writhing nude figure, their mouths close to their victim, as if to devour him or suck his blood. 
Below, two figures in peasants' garb recoil from the spectacle: one has thrown himself to the ground covering his ears, the other attempts to escape by covering himself with a blanket, making the  fig hand gesture to ward off the evil eye. Finally, a donkey emerges on the right, seemingly oblivious to the rest of the scene.

The general scholarly consensus is that the painting represents a rationalist critique of superstition and ignorance, particularly in religious matters: the witches' corozas are not only emblematic of the violence of the Spanish Inquisition (the upward flames indicate that they have been condemned as unrepentant heretics and will be burned at the stake), 
but are also reminiscent of episcopal mitres, bearing the characteristic double points. The accusations of religious tribunals are thus reflected back on themselves, whose actions are implicitly equated with superstition and ritualized sacrifice. 
The bystanders can then be understood either as appalled but unable to do anything or willfully ignorant and unwilling to intervene.

The donkey, finally, is the traditional symbol of ignorance.

See also
List of works by Francisco Goya

Notes

References

External links

Witches in art
Paintings by Francisco Goya in the Museo del Prado
Donkeys in art
Nude art